Corey Michael Locke (born May 8, 1984) is a Canadian former professional ice hockey player. Since he made his professional debut in 2004, he has predominantly featured in the AHL, with appearances in the National Hockey League (NHL) for the Montreal Canadiens, New York Rangers and Ottawa Senators.

Playing career
Locke played one season of junior A hockey with the Newmarket Hurricanes and was signed by the Ottawa 67's of the Ontario Hockey League (OHL). Locke played three seasons in the OHL, winning the Red Tilson Trophy as the league's most outstanding player two years in a row. In 2003, his 151 points were the most in the CHL. During the 2002–2003 season, Locke and Matt Foy formed the most dangerous and dominant tandem in Ontario major junior hockey. Following this season, Locke was drafted 113th overall in the 2003 NHL Entry Draft by the Montreal Canadiens. He was returned to junior for the 2003–04 season.

On September 15, 2004, Locke signed a three-year entry level contract with the Canadiens. He was then assigned to their AHL affiliate, the Hamilton Bulldogs for further development, and won the Calder Cup with the Bulldogs in the 2006–07 AHL season. After averaging almost a point per game in Hamilton, Locke made his NHL debut (and only NHL appearance of the season) in Montreal on January 8, 2008.

In July 2008, Locke was traded by the Canadiens to the Minnesota Wild for Shawn Belle. Unable to make the Wild's opening night roster for the 2008–09 season, he was reassigned to the Houston Aeros, leading the team to the West Conference finals with 23 points in the final.

In 2009, Locke signed a one-year deal with the New York Rangers. He was then reassigned to AHL affiliate, the Hartford Wolf Pack to begin the 2009–10 season. On March 28, 2010, Locke was recalled to the NHL and made his Rangers debut in a 4-3 victory over the New York Islanders on March 30, 2010. After 3 games with the Blueshirts, Locke was returned to the AHL and finished the season with 85 points in 76 games to be named to the AHL Second All-Star Team.

In 2010, Locke signed a two-year contract with the Ottawa Senators. He recorded his first NHL point against the New York Islanders on January 13, 2011, when he assisted on a goal by Ottawa's Nick Foligno. Locke played the two seasons mainly with the Binghamton Senators. In 2011, he won the AHL MVP award, and the Senators won the AHL championship. Locke was injured for most of the 2011-12 season, and Binghamton failed to make the playoffs. At the end of the season, Locke was added to the Ottawa Senators roster, but did not play.

In 2012, Locke left the Senators to sign with TPS of the Finnish SM-liiga. After scoring only five goals, and with TPS not in championship contention, Locke was moved in January 2013 to Berlin to join the Polar Bears of the Deutsche Eishockey Liga, where he joined his former OHL teammate Matt Foy.

A free agent at the conclusion of the season in Germany, Locke returned to the American Hockey League, signing a one-year contract with the Chicago Wolves on July 31, 2013.

In October 2014, Locke inked a deal with the Nürnberg Ice Tigers of the German Deutsche Eishockey Liga for the remainder of the 2014-15 season.

On November 5, 2015, he was signed to a one-month contract by EHC Visp of the Swiss NLB. Scoring a better than point-per-game average, Locke was secured for the remainder of the season with Visp.

On July 13, 2015, Locke continued his European career, agreeing to a one-year deal with Austrian outfit, EC VSV of the EBEL.

Personal
Locke was born in Newmarket, Ontario, north of Toronto, and maintains a residence there. He has a younger brother named Kyle.

Career statistics

Awards and achievements

CHL
 First Team All-Star - 2004
 CHL Player of the Year - 2003
 CHL Top Scorer Award - 2003
 First Team All-Star - 2003

OHL
 Red Tilson Trophy - 2004
 Eddie Powers Memorial Trophy - 2004
 First Team All-Star - 2004
 Red Tilson Trophy - 2003
 Eddie Powers Memorial Trophy - 2003
 First Team All-Star - 2003

AHL
 Calder Cup Champion - 2007, 2011
 Second Team All-Star - 2010
 Hamilton Bulldogs career points leader (229)
 Hamilton Bulldogs career goals leader (85)
 Hamilton Bulldogs career assists leader (144)
 First All-Star Team - 2011
Les Cunningham Award - MVP 2011

Transactions
 July 11, 2008 - Montreal Canadiens (NHL) traded Corey Locke to Minnesota Wild (NHL) for Shawn Belle.
 July 3, 2009 - Signed as unrestricted free agent by the New York Rangers
 July 7, 2010 - Signed as unrestricted free agent by the Ottawa Senators

References

External links

1984 births
Living people
Abbotsford Heat players
Binghamton Senators players
Canadian ice hockey centres
Chicago Wolves players
EHC Black Wings Linz players
Eisbären Berlin players
Hamilton Bulldogs (AHL) players
Hartford Wolf Pack players
HC TPS players
Hillcrest High School (Ottawa) alumni
Houston Aeros (1994–2013) players
Ice hockey people from Ontario
Montreal Canadiens draft picks
Montreal Canadiens players
New York Rangers players
Ottawa 67's players
Ottawa Senators players
Sportspeople from Newmarket, Ontario
EHC Visp players
EC VSV players
Canadian expatriate ice hockey players in Austria
Canadian expatriate ice hockey players in Finland
Canadian expatriate ice hockey players in Germany
Canadian expatriate ice hockey players in Switzerland